Momo Wandel Soumah (1926 - June 15, 2003) was a singer, composer, and saxophonist from Guinea, recognisable by his characteristic gravelly voice.

Soumah started out in the 1950s playing in dance bands, but moved to modern Guinean music following the cultural revolution. He was a part of the greatly influential Syli Orchestra (originally Syli Orchestre National) who were formed under the instruction of the first elected president Sekou Toure. The group of Guinea's elite musicians were selected to travel throughout Guinea and inspire and instruct musicians across the country and help set up the regional orchestras that were key to Sekou Toure's 'Authenticité' programme to promote and proliferate 'authentic'  Guinean traditional music after colonial rule. From the mid 1980s Soumah developed an idiosyncratic blend of jazz and African traditional music.

He died suddenly on June 15, 2003. At the time of his death Soumah was musical director of Circus Baobab.

Discography
 Matchowé (1992)
 Afro Swing (2001)
 Momo Le Doyen (soundtrack, 2007)

Contributing artist
 Unwired: Africa (2000, World Music Network)
 Desert Blues 2 (2002, Network)

See also
 Momo Le Doyen a film by Laurent Chevalier, 2006

References

External links
  – video of Soumah talking (in French) about the cultural revolution of 1958.

1926 births
2003 deaths
Guinean composers
Guinean musicians
Jazz saxophonists
20th-century saxophonists